GG may refer to:

Gaming
 GG (gaming), an abbreviation used in video games meaning "good game"
 GameGuard, a hacking protection program used in some MMORPGs
 Game Gear, a handheld game console released by SEGA
 Game Genie, a video game cheat cartridge
 Guilty Gear, a fighting game series by Arc System Works
 The G.G. Shinobi, a side-scrolling action game by Sega released for the Game Gear in 1991
 Gamergate (harassment campaign)

Music 
 G. G. (album), a 1975 album by Gary Glitter
 Girls' Generation, Korean girl group

Television 
 Game Grumps, a video gaming web series
 Gossip Girl, an American teen drama series
 GG, the production code for the 1967 Doctor Who serial The Underwater Menace

Transportation 
 GG (New York City Subway service)
 Sky Lease Cargo's IATA designation
 GG, a version of the Subaru Impreza station wagon
 GG Duetto, a motorcycle+sidecar built by Swiss Grüter+Gut Motorradtechnik GmbH (GG)

Other uses 
 .gg, the top-level domain country code for Guernsey
 Gadu-Gadu, an instant messaging program popular in Poland
 Galle Gladiators, a team participating in Lanka Premier League
 General Government, Nazi-occupied territory of the Second Republic of Poland
 Gigagram or Gg
 Kenkyūsha's New Japanese-English Dictionary or Green Goddess
 Grundgesetz, the German constitution
 Goldcorp's NYSE symbol
 Groß-Gerau's vehicle registration code
 GG, a trademark of fashion house Gucci
 GG, a bra size
 GG Allin, transgressive American hardcore punk singer-songwriter
 GG Bridge, short for Golden Gate Bridge
 GG cycle, a rocket engine operation method, see gas-generator cycle

See also 
 Gee Gee (disambiguation)
 Gigi (disambiguation)
 G&G (disambiguation)
 Ottawa Gee-Gees, sports teams for University of Ottawa
 PRR GG1, a class of electric locomotives built for the Pennsylvania Railroad